Deja Vu (데자뷰) is South Korean boy band SS501's third mini-album. It was released on March 13, 2008, three years after their second mini album. During those three years, they released their first studio album, S.T 01 Now in 2006, and had been busy focusing with Japanese activities. Therefore, this album marked their comeback in Korea.

The album contains three dance tracks, in which the lead title track, "Deja Vu" was promoted first. They, then, began to promote their second single, "A Song Calling for You" after a while. They performed their Goodbye Stage on Music Bank in June 2008, to return to Japanese activities.

Track listing

Music videos
 "Deja Vu"
 "A song calling for you"

References

External links

 
 

SS501 albums
2006 EPs